Isata Mahoi (born in Ribbi Chiefdom, Moyamba District) from a ruling (Royal) family, is a Sierra Leonean radio talk show host and actress in the soap opera program Atunda Ayenda. Mahoi, who is commonly known in Sierra Leone by her stage name Mammy Saio, is one of the most famous Sierra Leonean entertainers. In recent years she has been involved on gender issues and specifically focusing on the human rights of women and children. She is also an economist who believes in making a change in her country.

Atunda Ayenda is the most popular and most widely listened to radio program in Sierra Leone. Atunda Ayenda was created through non-government organisation search to help people understand the political and social conditions that have unfolded in Sierra Leone. The show is broadcast on all major radio stations throughout Sierra Leone.

External links
https://web.archive.org/web/20080723215930/http://www.usaid.gov/sl/sl_new/news/2004/040531_atunda_ayenda/index.htm

Year of birth missing (living people)
Living people
Sierra Leonean actresses
Soap opera actresses
Radio actresses
People from Moyamba District